Neckarsulm Nord station is a railway station in the municipality of Neckarsulm, located in the Heilbronn district in Baden-Württemberg, Germany.

It is adjacent to the major Audi motor factory.

References

Railway stations in Baden-Württemberg
Buildings and structures in Heilbronn (district)